Erik Erichsen (born 15 July 1950) is a Norwegian rower. He competed in the men's coxless pair event at the 1972 Summer Olympics.

References

1950 births
Living people
Norwegian male rowers
Olympic rowers of Norway
Rowers at the 1972 Summer Olympics
Rowers from Oslo